All the Same... or Not is a Brazilian comedy-drama streaming television series for children and adolescents, which is produced by Cinefilm for Disney+. The series is based on the youth book novel Na porta ao lado by the Brazilian writer Luly Trigo. In Brazil, the ten-part first season of the series was released on May 25, 2022 on Disney+.

The series has been renewed for a second season, which is scheduled for release in 2023.

Plot  
16-year-old Carol is going through a period of major changes in her life. On the one hand, Carol has to deal with her mother's marriage to her new boyfriend and the impending relationship with her future stepbrother. On the other hand, a new school year begins in high school, in which Carol starts her first real relationship and experiences various situations with her long-time friends that also put their friendship to the test. Carol faces the typical challenges of being a teenager and experiences feelings that she has never felt in this form before and learns that the first step to happiness is to know yourself and also to respect your own feelings, even if you are makes one or two mistakes on the way there.

Cast 
 Gabriella Saraivah as	Carol
 Ana Jeckel as	Beta
 Duda Matte as	Trix
 Clara Buarque as Amanda
 Guilhermina Libanio as Pri
 Guthierry Sotero as Bruno
 Ronald Sotto as Bernardo
 Daniel Botelho as	Tomás
 Kiko Pissolato as	Carlos
 Miá Mello as Beth

Episodes

Production 
The series was announced on December 2020 by series protagonist Gabriella Saraivah.  In the video, Gabriella and the author of the series Lully Trigo, talk about the experience of recording for Disney+. The series adaptation was developed by André Rodrigues and Luly Trigo with production by Cinefilm. The recordings officially started in March 2021, in São Paulo. Due to the worsening of the COVID-19 pandemic, the recordings were suspended and resumed on May 17 and ended on July 8 of the same year. On May 6, 2022, Disney confirmed the production's premiere for May 25 of the same year. On May 10, the official poster and trailer was released.

References

External links 
 
 

Comedy-drama television series
Television shows filmed in Brazil
2020s Brazilian television series
Portuguese-language television shows
Disney+ original programming
Television series about teenagers